Abebech Negussie (born 2 January 1983 in Arsi) is a retired Ethiopian middle distance runner, who specialized in 1500 metres. She represented Ethiopia in that event at the 2000 Sydney Olympics and the 2001 World Championships in Athletics.

International competitions

Personal bests
800 metres - 2:04.13 min (2000)
1500 metres - 4:06.01 min (2001)

External links

1983 births
Living people
Ethiopian female long-distance runners
Ethiopian female middle-distance runners
Athletes (track and field) at the 2000 Summer Olympics
Olympic athletes of Ethiopia
Sportspeople from Oromia Region
World Athletics Championships athletes for Ethiopia
20th-century Ethiopian women
21st-century Ethiopian women